DriveIt NQ is a permanent race track and driver training facility under construction in Townsville, Queensland, Australia.

History
Plans for a dedicated motoring and motorsport facility in North Queensland emerged in February 2016, partially driven by the success of the Townsville 500, when driver training operator Pat Driscoll signed a long-term lease with Townsville City Council over a plot of land in Calcium to the citys' west. Plans for the facility publicly emerged in September 2018 before construction on the facility began in August 2020 following input from Jack Miller, Paul Morris and Molly Taylor. Having secured AU$22 million in State and Federal funding, asphalt laying on the base circuit concluded in February 2023.

References

External links
Circuit website

Motorsport venues in Queensland